Turbo sarmaticus, common names South African turban, giant turban, ollycrock, or alikreukel, is a species of sea snail, marine gastropod mollusk in the family Turbinidae.

Some authors place this species in the subgenus Sarmaticus.

Description
The length of the shell varies between 40 mm and 120 mm. The imperforate shell has a globose-depressed shape. Its color pattern is dull brownish, above flammulated, below more or less banded or maculate with white, usually showing more or less of the underlying orange-red layer, between which and the nacre there is a stratum of intense black. The very short spire is conic. The 5-6 whorls are convex but concave above. The upper ones contain revolving lirae. They are frequently carinated, the last traversed by several rows of nodules, of which the coronal is the more prominent and constant. The large, orbicular aperture is very oblique and beautifully nacreous within. The  outer lip is thin, margined with intense black within. The nacre does not extend to the edge. The arcuate columella is wide, slightly produced below, broadly excavated above. The parietal wall is eroded, showing a black blotch.

The operculum is flat within. It contains 5-6 whorls and a submedian nucleus. The outer surface is convex, whitish, and covered with calcareous pustules on the exterior side.

Distribution
This marine species occurs abundantly off the south coast of South Africa.

References

 Trew, A., 1984. The Melvill-Tomlin Collection. Part 30. Trochacea. Handlists of the Molluscan Collections in the Department of Zoology, National Museum of Wales.
 Alf A. & Kreipl K. (2003). A Conchological Iconography: The Family Turbinidae, Subfamily Turbininae, Genus Turbo. Conchbooks, Hackenheim Germany.
 Williams, S.T. (2007). Origins and diversification of Indo-West Pacific marine fauna: evolutionary history and biogeography of turban shells (Gastropoda, Turbinidae). Biological Journal of the Linnean Society, 2007, 92, 573–592.

External links

  Branch, G.M. et al. (2002). Two Oceans. 5th impression. David Philip, Cate Town & Johannesburg
 

Endemic fauna of South Africa
sarmaticus
Gastropods described in 1758
Taxa named by Carl Linnaeus